Querceto may refer to:
 Robert de Chesney (died 1166), medieval bishop of Lincoln
  Querceto, a hamlet in the municipality of Casciana Terme Lari in Italy
 Querceto (Montecatini Val di Cecina), a frazione of the Province of Pisa in Italy